Ringgold is an unincorporated community in Morgan County, Ohio, United States.

History
Ringgold was platted in 1846, and named for Samuel Ringgold, a United States Army officer. A post office was established at Ringgold in 1847, and remained in operation until 1939.

References

Unincorporated communities in Morgan County, Ohio
Unincorporated communities in Ohio
1846 establishments in Ohio